Market! Market! (also known as Ayala Malls Market! Market!) is a real estate development owned by Ayala Land, a real estate subsidiary of Ayala Corporation and part of the Ayala Malls chain. It is located at McKinley Parkway, Bonifacio Global City, Taguig in Metro Manila, Philippines. Groundbreaking was conducted in August 2002 and it was opened on September 16, 2004. The mall is aimed at the middle market unlike other Ayala malls which caters to the upper socioeconomic class.

Location
Market! Market! is located in a  area across Bonifacio High Street and Serendra. It is situated on the former location of the Gen. Douglas MacArthur Staff House. The mall underwent several major renovations in view of market competition with SM Prime Holdings' upscale mall, SM Aura Premier, which is located just across 26th Street.

Reception
Maxi Award of Merit (International Council of Shopping Centers, Inc., 2005)
Finalist, Best Shopping Center of the Year (Philippine Retailer's Association and Department of Trade & Industry, 2006)

See also
SM Aura Premier
List of shopping malls in the Philippines

References

External links
Market! Market! Official website

Shopping malls in Taguig
Bonifacio Global City
Ayala Malls
Shopping malls established in 2004